The silver labeo (Labeo ruddi) is an African species of freshwater fish in the family Cyprinidae. It can reach a length up to 30 cm and weight of 1 kg.

Distribution and habitat
Silver labeo can be found in the lowveld stretches of the Limpopo and Incomati rivers (South Africa, Eswatini, Mozambique, Zimbabwe), and in a geographically distinct Cunene River population on the Angola–Namibia border.

The silver labeo prefers deeper waters in or associated with main river channels and off channel pools, and is found over sand or mud bottoms. In the rainy season it will move upstream for breeding.

References 

Paul Skelton. 2001. A Complete Guide to the freshwater fishes of Southern Africa. 

Labeo
Cyprinid fish of Africa
Freshwater fish of Angola
Fish of Mozambique
Freshwater fish of Namibia
Freshwater fish of South Africa
Fish of Zimbabwe
Fish described in 1907
Taxa named by George Albert Boulenger